Brodnica  is a town in northern Poland with 28,574 inhabitants . It is the seat of Brodnica County in the Kuyavian-Pomeranian Voivodeship. The nearby Brodnica Landscape Park, a protected area, gets its name from Brodnica.

Brodnica is the capital of the district whose present quarter Michałowo, a settlement mentioned as early as in 1138 and then in 1240 as castrum Michałowo, hides relics from Neolithic era. As it is confirmed in old documents Michałowo was the capital of the Masovian Castellany. The town was chosen owing to its good position on the Drwęca (on the trade route leading from Masovia to Prussia) and a customs house between Dobrzyń and Chełmno Land (mentioned in 1252).

History

The first reference to the town of Brodnica dates from 1263. In 1285–1370 the construction of the Gothic Church of St. Catherine took place. Brodnica received town privileges in 1298. In 1414, a Polish–Teutonic truce was signed there, ending the Hunger War. In 1440, the town was one of the founding members of the Prussian Confederation, which opposed Teutonic rule, and upon the request of which King Casimir IV Jagiellon reincorporated the territory to the Kingdom of Poland in 1454. In May 1454 the town pledged allegiance to the Polish King in Toruń. After the end of the Thirteen Years' War, the Teutonic Knights renounced claims to the town, and recognized it as part of Poland. It became a royal town of the Polish Crown, administratively located in the Chełmno Voivodeship. In the Teutonic state Brodnica was the seat of the Commander, in the Polish Kingdom it was the capital of the district starosty, and the former Commander's lands were then royal property.

A favourable location on the intersection of important routes used for transportation of different goods (wood, fish, furs, animal skin, grain, wool) accelerated the development of the town, making it an important trading centre, the status still reflected in the number of well-preserved granaries along the Drwęca. Between 1486 and 1604 the town belonged to the Działyński family, then between 1604 and 1625 to Anna Vasa of Sweden who was the royal sister of Sigismund III Vasa, King of Poland, Lithuania, and Sweden. In later years it was the property Queen Cecily Renata, Chancellor Jerzy Ossoliński, Queen Maria Casimira, and Marshal Franciszek Bieliński.

Brodnica was annexed by the Kingdom of Prussia in 1772, during the First Partition of Poland, but in 1807, during the Napoleonic Wars, Brodnica became part of the short-lived Duchy of Warsaw. In 1815, Brodnica, known as Strasburg in German, was again annexed by Prussia. In 1871, it also became part of the German Empire. After 1785, the Prussians dismantled the Brodnica Castle, preserving only the tower, which is currently the highest Gothic tower in Poland east of the Vistula, and serves as a museum and a watchtower. The town had a Protestant church, a Catholic church, a synagogue, a grammar school, a district court, a main customs office and several commercial operations.

The 19th century saw 20 thousand Polish soldiers interned after the failure of the November Uprising (1830–1831) and many townspeople and noblemen involved in the January Uprising (1863). It is in the Brodnica region too that Masovian insurgents sought refuge from Russian persecution after the failure of the January Uprising. Bank Spółdzielczy w Brodnicy, which is the oldest continuously operating Polish bank, was established in 1862. In 1873 a Polish philomath organization was founded in the local gymnasium, whose activity ended in 1901 due to Germany's anti-Polish policies.

Between 1886 and 1910, Brodnica received railway connections with Działdowo, Grudziądz, Iława, Sierpc and Jabłonowo Pomorskie, which made it an important railway junction and triggered industrial progress. In the 19th century, the Chełmno Land (and Brodnica in particular) was a refuge for Polish patriots who contributed greatly to social, cultural and economic life of the region, like Ignacy Łyskowski.

In January 1920, after the end of World War I and the Treaty of Versailles, Brodnica was reintegrated with Poland, which had recently regained independence. On 18 August 1920, the town was the site of a Polish victory over the invading Soviets in the  during the Polish–Soviet War. In the 1920s the town was visited by highest Polish dignitaries: Prime Minister Wincenty Witos, Marshal Józef Piłsudski and President Stanisław Wojciechowski.

During the occupation of Poland (World War II), in 1939, Germans carried out mass arrests of local Poles, who were later murdered in the area or deported to Nazi concentration camps. Some of these Poles were murdered in Skrwilno between 15 October and 15 November 1939 and in Brzezinki in October 1939. The interwar principal of the local high school, Klemens Malicki, was among the Polish principals and teachers murdered in the Oranienburg concentration camp as part of the Intelligenzaktion Pommern. In 1940–1941, the Germans carried out expulsions of Poles, whose homes, shops and workshops were then handed over to German colonists as part of the Lebensraum policy. An Einsatzgruppen penal camp was operated in the town during the occupation, and in 1944, the Germans also established a subcamp of the Stutthof concentration camp, intended for female prisoners. The German occupation ended in January 1945.

In 1975–1998, it was administratively located in the Toruń Voivodeship.

Climate
Climate in this area has mild differences between highs and lows, and there is adequate rainfall year-round.  The Köppen Climate Classification subtype for this climate is "Cfb". (Marine West Coast Climate).

Location 

Points of interest 
During World War I, Brodnica became the site of a German war cemetery. During the Polish–Soviet War, 31 Polish soldiers killed during the Battle of Brodnica on 18 August 1920 were laid to rest here. In 1943, German soldiers who died in the local hospital together with those who lost their lives on 21 January 1945 during the Soviet offensive were put in the ground. A curiosity is that the Red Army soldiers who died on the same day were buried here as well. It is also a burial place for agents of the Ministry of Public Security who fought Polish anti-communist partisans during the Polish People's Republic.

Sport
The sports teams in the city include the football club Sparta Brodnica, the handball MKS Brodnica club, the Karate Shotokan Brodnica club, the Aikido Brodnicka Akademia Aikido club, the boxing Klub Bokserski Gladiator Brodnica, and the MMA Fight Team MMA Brodnica.

Culture

The Museum of Brodnica (Muzeum w Brodnicy) consists of three branches, focusing on history, archeology and contemporary art. It is located in the Renaissance granary, the Brodnica Castle tower and the Gothic Chełmińska Gate.

Musicians 
Sebastian Kuchczynski – (born 9 August 1986 in Brodnica) is a drummer, composer and arranger. He Graduated from Berklee Collage of Music in Boston, Master's degree, 2017. He is an influential jazz, hip hop, funk and pop drummer. He is a member of bands such as "Radiostatik", "Schmidt Electric", "Ola Trzaska" etc. He also plays with George Garzone, Zbigniew Namysłowski and Maciej Sikała.

International relations

Twin towns – Sister cities

Brodnica is twinned with:
  Strasburg, Germany
  Brørup, Denmark
  Kėdainiai, Lithuania
  Kristinehamn, Sweden
  Chamalières, France
  Koprivnica, Croatia
  Hummelo en Keppel, Netherlands
  Sevan, Armenia

People who were born or lived in Brodnica and Brodnica County 

 Martin Truchseß von Wetzhausen – Grand Master of the Teutonic Knights
 Simon Syrenius – Polish botanist and academic
 Anna Vasa of Sweden – Swedish princess made starosta of Brodnica in 1605 by Sigismund III Vasa
 Wojciech Dębołęcki – Polish monk, writer and composer
 Paul von Krause – German jurist and politician
 Robert Garrison – German film actor
 Stanisława Walasiewicz – Polish athlete, who became a women's Olympic champion.
 Jan Zumbach – Polish fighter pilot who became an ace during the Second World War
 Małgorzata Birbach – Polish long-distance runner
 Łukasz Fabiański – Polish footballer
 Jakub Wawrzyniak – Polish footballer
 Robert Kłos – Polish footballer
 Jakub Zabłocki – Polish footballer
 Daniel Trojanowski – Polish rower
 Patryk Kuchczyński – Polish team handball player
 Mateusz Łęgowski – Polish footballer

Gallery

Notes

References

 Visit Brodnica 
 BRODNICA – Poland In UNDISCOVERED on youtube.com

External links 
  

Cities and towns in Kuyavian-Pomeranian Voivodeship
Brodnica County
Pomeranian Voivodeship (1919–1939)
Holocaust locations in Poland